Oedipoda miniata, sometimes known as the red-winged grasshopper (although the name is also used for O. germanica), is a grasshopper species in the subfamily Oedipodinae found in Southern Europe, northern Africa and the Middle-East.

It was originally described in 1771 as Gryllus miniatus. It is in the Oedipoda caerulescens species group.

Subspecies
Orthoptera Species File and the Catalogue of Life list three subspecies:
 Oedipoda miniata miniata (Pallas, 1771)
 Oedipoda miniata atripes Bei-Bienko, 1951
 Oedipoda miniata mauritanica Lucas, H., 1849

References

Oedipodinae
Orthoptera of Europe
Insects described in 1771
Taxa named by Peter Simon Pallas